Manuel Strodel (born January 17, 1992 in Buchloe) is a German professional ice hockey player currently playing for EC Bad Neuheim of the DEL2. He previously played for Düsseldorfer EG in the Deutsche Eishockey Liga (DEL).

Strodel played the entirety of his career until the conclusion of the 2018–19 season, with Düsseldorfer EG. After 8 seasons with the club, Strodel was not offered a new contract with Düsseldorfer on April 6, 2019.

References

External links
 

1992 births
Living people
DEG Metro Stars players
Düsseldorfer EG players
Füchse Duisburg players
Löwen Frankfurt players
German ice hockey forwards
People from Ostallgäu
Sportspeople from Swabia (Bavaria)